Robert Ivanovich Brichenok (  17 January – 5 February 1972) was a Soviet artillery lieutenant general. He took part in World War I, Russian Civil war, Winter war and World War II.

Gallery

Awards 
 Order of Lenin № 36030
 4 orders of the Red Banner 
 Order of Bogdan Khmelnitsky 1st class № 198
 Order of Kutuzov 2nd class № 711
 Medal "For the Defence of Leningrad"
 Medal "For the Defence of the Caucasus"
 Jubilee Medal "XX Years of the Workers' and Peasants' Red Army"
 Foreign awards:
 Commemorative Medal of the Battle of Dukla Pass (Czechoslovakia)
 Medal of Victory and Freedom 1945 (Poland)
 Medal for Participation In The Patriotic War 1944-1945 (Bulgary)
Awards of Robert Brichenok was sold with documents at "Baldwin's" auction for $100 000 in 2006.

References 

Russian military personnel of World War I
People of the Polish–Soviet War
Soviet military personnel of World War II
Soviet lieutenant generals
1893 births
1972 deaths